Ricardo Felipe dos Santos Esteves (born 16 September 1979) is a retired Portuguese footballer. On the right side of the pitch, he could play as either a defender or midfielder.

He played in 117 Primeira Liga games over the course of seven seasons, representing Vitória de Setúbal, Alverca, Benfica, Braga, Nacional, Paços de Ferreira and Marítimo in the competition. He also competed professionally in four other countries, mainly Italy.

Club career
Esteves was born in Lisbon. After arriving at S.L. Benfica at the age of 11 he moved constantly between the club's first and reserve teams, only appearing in ten games in the Primeira Liga, all in the same season. He was loaned once during his contract, and also had a brief spell with farm team F.C. Alverca.

Released in January 2002, Esteves represented in quick succession S.C. Braga, C.D. Nacional and F.C. Paços de Ferreira. Afterwards, he began an abroad adventure, playing three years in Italy with Reggina Calcio (two) and Vicenza Calcio in both major levels.

Esteves spent the 2007–08 campaign back in his country with C.S. Marítimo, after which he moved again, now to Greece and Asteras Tripoli FC. In January 2010 he was sold to FC Seoul, scoring in his debut against Daejeon Citizen FC.

In June, after four goals and as many assists, Esteves was released. Late in that month he returned to his country and former side Marítimo, which had qualified for the UEFA Europa League.

International career
All youth levels comprised, Esteves won 53 caps for Portugal (no goals). He participated with the under-20s in the 1999 FIFA World Youth Championship held in Nigeria; in the round of 16 against Japan, as the team had no substitutes left and Sérgio Leite got injured, he played as a goalkeeper for more than one hour, conceding no goals in regulation time in an eventual 4–5 penalty shootout loss (1–1 after 120 minutes).

References

External links

1979 births
Living people
Footballers from Lisbon
Portuguese footballers
Association football defenders
Association football midfielders
Primeira Liga players
Segunda Divisão players
Clube Oriental de Lisboa players
S.L. Benfica B players
Vitória F.C. players
F.C. Alverca players
S.L. Benfica footballers
S.C. Braga B players
S.C. Braga players
C.D. Nacional players
F.C. Paços de Ferreira players
C.S. Marítimo players
Serie A players
Serie B players
Reggina 1914 players
L.R. Vicenza players
Super League Greece players
Asteras Tripolis F.C. players
K League 1 players
FC Seoul players
Chinese Super League players
Dalian Shide F.C. players
Portugal youth international footballers
Portugal under-21 international footballers
Portuguese expatriate footballers
Expatriate footballers in Italy
Expatriate footballers in Greece
Expatriate footballers in South Korea
Expatriate footballers in China
Portuguese expatriate sportspeople in Italy
Portuguese expatriate sportspeople in Greece
Portuguese expatriate sportspeople in South Korea
Portuguese expatriate sportspeople in China